The Countryside of Simbal is a rural area located about 25 km west of Trujillo city. It is located in Simbal District and It is a place with recreational centers, agricultural areas, etc. It is visited mainly by people from Trujillo to spend weekends and for practicing adventure sports.

Description
It is characterized as a place of contact with nature, the countryside has cottages, countryside recreation centers, recreation center including River Bar which is located in the valley of a river between two mountains. In the countryside there are hostels for the night, Simbal is ripe for adventure sports at its rugged terrain.

See also
Simbal District
Countryside of Moche 
Trujillo

References

External links
Location countryside of Simbal (Wikimedia)

Multimedia

Localities of Trujillo, Peru